Teodor Stanisław Wieczorek (9 November 1923 – 26 May 2009) was a Polish footballer. He played in ten matches for the Poland national football team from 1949 to 1953.

References

External links
 

1923 births
2009 deaths
Polish footballers
Poland international footballers
Association footballers not categorized by position
People from Siemianowice Śląskie
AKS Chorzów players
Polish football managers
Odra Opole managers
Zagłębie Sosnowiec managers
Ruch Chorzów managers
Szombierki Bytom managers
Górnik Zabrze managers
Polonia Bytom managers
Piast Gliwice managers